Shushi District was an administrative unit within the former Nagorno-Karabakh Autonomous Oblast (NKAO) of the Azerbaijan Soviet Socialist Republic.

History 
The district was formed on 8 August 1930. Its capital was the city of Shusha. Shusha district was the only district in Nagorno-Karabakh Autonomous Oblast where Azerbaijanis formed a majority.

The Nagorno-Karabakh Autonomous Oblast was abolished on 26 November 1991.

Following the First Nagorno-Karabakh war, all of the district came under the control of the self-proclaimed Republic of Artsakh and was incorporated into its Shushi Province. However, following the Battle of Shusha during the 2020 Nagorno-Karabakh war, Azerbaijan recaptured the city of Shusha and several surrounding villages.

Demographics

References

Subdivisions of the Nagorno-Karabakh Autonomous Oblast
History of the Republic of Artsakh